Pretnar is a Slovenian surname. Notable people with this name include:

 Igor Pretnar (1924 – 1977) Slovenian film director
 Cveto Pretnar (born 1957) Slovenian ice hockey player who represented Yugoslavia at the 1984 Winter Olympics
 Špela Pretnar (born 1973) Slovenian alpine skier who represented Slovenia at the 2002 Winter Olympics
 Klemen Pretnar (born 1986) Slovenian ice hockey player who represented Slovenia at the 2011 IIHF World Championship